The non-marine molluscs of Armenia are a part of the molluscan fauna of Armenia (wildlife of Armenia). A number of species of non-marine molluscs are found in the wild in Armenia.

Freshwater gastropods

Hydrobiidae
 Nicolaia schniebsae Glöer, Bößneck, Walther & Neiber, 2015
 Shadinia akramowskii (Zhadin, 1952)
 Shadinia bjniensis Glöer, Bößneck, Walther & Neiber, 2015
 Shadinia terpoghassiani (Akramowski, 1952)

Valvatidae
 Valvata armeniaca Glöer & Walther, 2019

Land gastropods

Pomatiidae
 Pomatias rivulare (Eichwald, 1829)

Carychiidae
 Carychium minimum O.F.Müller, 1774

Succineidae
 Succinella oblonga (Draparnaud, 1801)
 Oxyloma elegans (Risso, 1826)
 Oxyloma sarsii (Esmark, 1886)

Cochlicopidae
 Cochlicopa lubrica (O.F.Müller, 1774)
 Cochlicopa lubricella (Porro, 1838)

Orculidae
 Orculella ruderalis Akramowski, 1947
 Sphyradium doliolum (Bruguière, 1792)

Lauriidae
 Lauria cylindracea (Da Costa, 1778)

Valloniidae
 Acanthinula aculeata (O.F.Müller, 1774)
 Vallonia costata (O.F.Müller, 1774)
 Vallonia pulchella (O.F.Müller, 1774)

Pupillidae
 Pupilla bipapulata Akramowski, 1947
 Pupilla inops (Reinhardt, 1877)
 Pupilla kyrostriata Walther & Hausdorf, 2014
 Pupilla muscorum (Linnaeus, 1758)
 Pupilla triplicata (Studer, 1820)
 Gibbulinopsis interrupta (Reinhardt, 1876)
 Gibbulinopsis signata (Mousson, 1873)

Vertiginidae
 Vertigo antivertigo (Draparnaud, 1801)
 Vertigo moulinsiana (Dupuy, 1849)
 Vertigo nitidula (Mousson, 1876)
 Columella columella (Martens, 1830)
 Columella edentula (Draparnaud, 1805)
 Truncatellina callicratis (Scacchi, 1833)
 Truncatellina costulata (Nilsson, 1822)
 Truncatellina cylindrica (Férussac, 1807)

Chondrinidae
 Chondrina granum (Draparnaud, 1801)

Pyramidulidae
 Pyramidula pusilla (Vallot, 1801)

Enidae
 Akramovskiella schuschaensis (Kobelt, 1902)
 Geminula isseliana (Bourguignat in Issel, 1865)
 Imparietula brevior (Mousson, 1876)
 Ljudmilena sieversi (Mousson, 1873)
 Merdigera obscura (O.F.Müller, 1774)
 Pseudochondrula tetrodon (Mortillet, 1854)
 Chondrula cf. sunzhica Steklov, 1962
 Chondrula tridens (O.F.Müller, 1774)
 Georginapaeus hohenackeri (L.Pfeiffer, 1848)
 Improvisa pupoides (Krynicki, 1833)

Clausiliidae
 Caspiophaedusa perlucens (O.Boettger, 1877)
 Akramowskia akramowskii (Likharev, 1962)
 Akramowskia valentini (Loosjes, 1964)
 Armenica disjuncta armenica Nordsieck, 1977
 Armenica likharevi Nordsieck, 1975
 Armenica narineae Gevorgyan & Egorov, 2020
 Armenica unicristata (O. Boettger, 1877)
 Elia derasa (Mousson, 1863)
 Mentissoidea rupicola (Mortillet, 1854)
 Scrobifera taurica (L.Pfeiffer, 1848)
 Mucronaria duboisi (Charpentier, 1852)
 Quadriplicata quadriplicata (A.Schmidt, 1868)

Ferussaciidae
 Cecilioides acicula (O.F.Müller, 1774)

Punctidae
 Punctum pygmaeum (Draparnaud, 1801)

Discidae
 Discus ruderatus (Férussac, 1821)

Pristilomatidae
 Vitrea contortula (Krynicki, 1837)
 Vitrea pygmaea (O.Boettger, 1880)

Oxychilidae
 Conulopolita sieversi (O.Boettger, 1879)
 Perpolita petronella (L.Pfeiffer, 1853)
 Eopolita derbentina (O.Boettger, 1886)
 Oxychilus cf. filicum (Krynicki, 1836)
 Oxychilus koutaisanus koutaisanus (Mousson, 1863)
 Oxychilus koutaisanus mingrelicus (Mousson, 1863)
 Oxychilus subeffusus (O.Boettger, 1879)

Vitrinidae
 Vitrina pellucida (O.F.Müller, 1774)
 Phenacolimax annularis (Studer, 1820)

Gastrodontidae
 Aegopinella pura (Alder, 1830)
 Zonitoides nitidus (O.F.Müller, 1774)

Euconulidae
 Euconulus fulvus (O.F.Müller, 1774)

Agriolimacidae
 Deroceras agreste (Linnaeus, 1758)
 Deroceras reticulatum (O.F.Müller, 1774)
 Deroceras caucasicum (Simroth, 1901)
 Krynickillus melanocephalus Kaleniczenko, 1851

Limacidae
 Gigantomilax brunneus (Simroth, 1901)
 Gigantomilax daghestanus (Simroth, 1898)
 Gigantomilax monticola armeniacus (Simroth, 1886)
 Limacus flavus Linnaeus, 1758
 Limacus maculatus (Kaleniczenko, 1851)

Trigonochlamydidae
 Hyrcanolestes velitaris (Martens, 1880) 
 Trigonochlamys imitatrix O.Boettger, 1881         

Parmacellidae
 Parmacella ibera Eichwald, 1841         

Helicidae
 Levantina djulfensis (Dubois de Montpéreux, 1840)
 Levantina escheriana (Bourguignat, 1864)
 Helix albescens Rossmässler, 1839
 Helix lucorum Linnaeus, 1758

Hygromiidae
 Xeropicta derbentina (Krynicki, 1836)
 Kalitinaia crenimargo (L. Pfeiffer, 1848)
 Stenomphalia selecta (Klika, 1894)
 Stenomphalia pisiformis (L.Pfeiffer, 1846)
 Stenomphalia ravergiensis (Férussac, 1835)
 Monacha fruticola (Krynicki, 1833)
 Harmozica zangezurica Gural-Sverlova, Amiryan & Gural, 2017

Freshwater bivalves

See also

Lists of molluscs of surrounding countries:
 List of non-marine molluscs of Georgia
 List of non-marine molluscs of Azerbaijan
 List of non-marine molluscs of Iran
 List of non-marine molluscs of Turkey

References

Molluscs
Armenia
Armenia
Molluscs of Asia